The Air Cadet Gliding Program is a youth gliding program operated by the Canadian Forces (CF) and the Air Cadet League of Canada for the benefit of the Royal Canadian Air Cadets.

The program is managed by CF officers (most of whom are CIC officers), and is the largest producer of glider pilots in Canada. Cadets aged 16-18 years are trained at the five summer Regional Gliding Schools, and about 320 cadets receive their glider pilot license each year.

Outside of the Regional Gliding Schools, the local headquarters provide the opportunity for cadets to participate in gliding familiarization flying during the spring and fall — approximately 22,000 flights are completed. Senior cadets who have completed the Air Cadet Gliding Program also perform staff duties at glider familiarization flying and at the summer training program.

Locations of the Regional Gliding Schools
Regional Gliding School (Pacific) - RGS (P) - Comox, BC
Regional Gliding School (Northwest) - RGS (NW) - Brandon, MB
Central Region Gliding School - (CRGS) - Mountain View, ON and Picton, ON
Eastern Region Gliding School - (ERGS) - St-Jean-sur-Richelieu, QC
Regional Gliding School (Atlantic) - RGS(A) - Debert, NS

Following a hiatus in 2020 and 2021 due to the global pandemic, the Glider Pilot Training Course resumed at a limited capacity in Northwest, Central, and Eastern regions, with candidates participating from all 5 regions.

References

External links
 The Air Cadet League of Canada
 The Air Cadet Gliding Program

Gliding in Canada